Lost, released in 1995, is the third album by Dutch power metal band Elegy.

Track listing 
"Lost" - 4:41
"Everything" - 6:00
"Clean Up Your Act" - 5:03 
"Always with You" - 4:33 
"Under Gods Naked Eyes" - 4:51 
"1998 (The Prophecy)" (instrumental) - 2:34
"Spirits" - 6:44
"Crossed the Line" - 5:30 
"Live It Again" - 4:10 
"Spanish Inquisition" - 4:03

Bonus Tracks (2009 re-release) 
"I’m No Fool" (demo 1990)
"Labyrinth of Dreams" (demo 1990)

Contributing Members 
Eduard Hovinga - vocal, guitars (track 5) 
Henk Van Der Laars - guitars, bass (track 5) 
Gilbert Pot - guitars 
Martin Helmantel - bass 
Dirk Bruinenberg - drums 
Gerrit Nager - keyboards

External links
 Encyclopaedia Metallum entry

1995 albums
Elegy (band) albums
Noise Records albums